Milliken is a statutory town in Weld County, Colorado, United States. The town population was 5,610 at the 2010 United States Census.

History
The town was named for John D. Milliken, a Judge.

The first community located near the Milliken townsite was initially known as Hillsboro. The community began as a trading post on the Denver, Laramie, and Northwestern Railroad for agricultural goods in the 1860s. By 1908 the town of Milliken had grown up nearby Hillsboro, and in 1910 Hillsboro was annexed by Milliken.

Fires in the 1910s destroyed much of the town, and in 1917 the Denver, Laramie, and Northwestern Railroad was abandoned.

Milliken continued as a primarily farming community through the depression and world wars. In the 1950s two large potato decks were constructed. The late 1960s and early 1970s brought a housing boom.

In 1985 and 1986 the town roads were paved. The town continued to grow, causing the town government to move its facilities, in 1996, into the Milliken Community Complex. Additional facilities were added, including the Milliken Public Work Facility in 2004, and a new police station in 2009.

Geography
Milliken is located at  (40.331073, -104.859878).

Demographics

As of the census of 2000, there were 2,888 people, 866 households, and 717 families residing in the town. The racial makeup of the town was 73.89% White, 0.31% African American, 1.18% Native American, 0.48% Asian, 21.61% from other races, and 2.53% from two or more races. Hispanic or Latino of any race were 40.75% of the population.

There were 866 households, out of which 48.5% had children under the age of 18 living with them, 69.4% were married couples living together, 9.7% had a female householder with no husband present, and 17.2% were non-families. 12.0% of all households were made up of individuals, and 3.0% had someone living alone who was 65 years of age or older. The average household size was 3.33 and the average family size was 3.63.

In the town, the population was spread out, with 35.1% under the age of 18, 10.7% from 18 to 24, 32.3% from 25 to 44, 16.4% from 45 to 64, and 5.4% who were 65 years of age or older. The median age was 27 years. For every 100 females, there were 96.3 males. For every 100 females age 18 and over, there were 99.0 males.

The median income for a household in the town was $43,603, and the median income for a family was $47,188. Males had a median income of $33,646 versus $22,417 for females. The per capita income for the town was $14,484. About 9.1% of families and 12.2% of the population were below the poverty line, including 14.9% of those under age 18 and 8.8% of those age 65 or over.

Education
Milliken is served by the Weld Re-5J School District. Children in the town attend Milliken Elementary School, Milliken Middle School, and Knowledge Quest Academy (KQA), while high schoolers attend Roosevelt High School in nearby Johnstown.

See also

Outline of Colorado
Index of Colorado-related articles
State of Colorado
Colorado cities and towns
Colorado municipalities
Colorado counties
Weld County, Colorado
Colorado metropolitan areas
Front Range Urban Corridor
North Central Colorado Urban Area
Denver–Aurora combined statistical area
Greeley, CO Metropolitan Statistical Area
Dent site, near Milliken, the first site to provide evidence that men hunted mammoth

References

External links
 
Town of Milliken website
CDOT map of the Town of Milliken

Towns in Weld County, Colorado
Towns in Colorado